St. Anne School, founded in 1949, is a private, parochial elementary school, grades pre-Kindergarten through eighth, located in Fair Lawn, New Jersey.  St. Anne's is of Roman Catholic denomination, and the school's district is the Roman Catholic Archdiocese of Newark.  St. Anne School has been accredited by Middle States Association of Colleges and Schools and was last credited April 2007. St. Anne School serves children of any race or ethnic background in the surrounding towns in Bergen County, New Jersey, such as Fair Lawn, Elmwood Park, Saddle Brook, Paterson, and others.

As of the 2005-06 school year, the school had an enrollment of 318 students (plus 45 students in PreK) and 25.0 classroom teachers (on an FTE basis), for a student-teacher ratio of 12.7.

St. Anne's was permanently shut down towards the end of the 2020 school year after the archdiocese decided to close multiple schools due to financial losses from the pandemic.

Catholic Tradition  
As a Catholic school, St. Anne's focuses on the Christian community, as well as living as a follower of Jesus Christ.  Prayer  begins and ends each day for the approximately 250 students in attendance.  St. Anne School strongly believes in living as a disciple of Jesus.  Students study religious education in their classes each day.  During a holy day of obligation, the student body attends mass at St. Anne Church, located across the street from the school.  Different grades host different masses by directly participating, either in the choir, as a lector, as a gift bearer, or as an altar server.  By participating in the mass, the students can learn more about the Catholic religion, its traditions and customs.

Religion at St. Anne's is held at the top.  The faculty and staff of St. Anne's model Christlike behavior in their way of living.  By living like Jesus, teachers can demonstrate love, compassion, and companionship to the students.  Students may then imitate the ways of their teachers in order to follow the way of Jesus.

Curriculum 
Every lesson at St. Anne's is based on the New Jersey Core Curriculum Standards and Archdiocesan Guidelines.  Each grade is taught certain subjects daily.  These subjects include religion, social studies, language arts, math, reading, and science.  Weekly classes, such as physical education, computer education, music, Spanish, and art, are also taught.

Student activities  
Students at St. Anne's are involved in various activities.  Athletics are offered, as well.  Girls and boys can participate in intramural, junior varsity, and varsity basketball teams and in junior varsity and varsity cheerleading.  Other activities offered are Student Council, Boy Scouts, Girl Scouts, and for eighth graders, Yearbook and Safety Patrol.

References

External links
St. Anne School website
Data for St. Anne School, National Center for Education Statistics

Schools in Bergen County, New Jersey
Private elementary schools in New Jersey
Private middle schools in New Jersey
Roman Catholic Archdiocese of Newark